John August List (born September 25, 1968) is an American economist known for establishing field experiments as a tool in empirical economic analysis. He works at the University of Chicago, where he serves as Kenneth C. Griffin Distinguished Service Professor; from 2012 until 2018, he served as Chairman of the Department of Economics. Since 2016, he has served as Visiting Robert F. Hartsook Chair in Fundraising at Indiana University Lilly Family School of Philanthropy. List is noted for his pioneering contributions to field experiments in economics, with Nobel prize winning economist George Akerlof and noted law professor Cass Sunstein writing that "List has done more than anyone else to advance the methods and practice of field experiments."  Nobel prize winning economist Gary Becker quipped that "John List's work in field experiments is revolutionary."

As detailed in his popular science book, The Why Axis (co-authored with Uri Gneezy), List uses field experiments to offer new insights in various areas of economics research, such as education, private provision of public goods, discrimination, social preferences, prospect theory, environmental economics, marketplace effects on corporate and government policy decisions, gender and inclusion, corporate social responsibility and auctions.  The book became an international best-seller and represented List's field experiments from the early 1990s until 2010.

List published a second popular book, The Voltage Effect, in February, 2022, that has become a runaway best seller, making the Wall Street Journal, New York Times, USA Today, Publishers Weekly, Porchlight, Washington Post, and LA Times best seller lists.   The book is based on a collection of academic articles written by List on scaling.  With a suite of coauthors, List has produced both theoretical and empirical insights concerning the "science of using science."  In The Voltage Effect, List argues that scaling, at its roots, is an Anna Karenina problem, overturning the conventional wisdom that the problem is a "silver bullet" or "best shot" problem.  This leads List to present a thesis that "Every scalable idea is the same, each unscalable idea is unscalable in its own way."  List revealed his work at Colby College in 2021.

List received his bachelor's degree from the University of Wisconsin–Stevens Point, and his Ph.D. from the University of Wyoming in 1996. He had his first teaching position at the University of Central Florida, and he then moved to the University of Arizona and the University of Maryland, College Park, where he still holds an adjunct position, before moving to Chicago. List also spends time at Tilburg University, where he is a distinguished visiting scholar and Resources for the Future, where he is a University Distinguished Scholar.  From May 2002 to July 2003 he served as Senior Economist, President's Council of Economic Advisers. In 2011 List was elected to the American Academy of Arts and Sciences.  In 2015 he was elected Fellow of the Econometric Society and, according to RePEc, was the top ranked economist worldwide of the 40,000 economists who graduated in the last 20 years. As of the end of 2022, RePEc ranks him as the 5th most influential economist in the world.

Career 
John attended Sun Prairie High School, graduating in 1987.  He became an Academic All-American in golf at the University of Wisconsin–Stevens Point in 1990 and 1991, while majoring in economics, graduating in 1992. He received his Ph.D. from the University of Wyoming in 1996 under supervision of Shelby Gerking. He began his career at the University of Central Florida as an assistant professor in 1996.  He became an associate professor in 2000 at the University of Arizona where he worked with Vernon L. Smith on furthering his field experimental methods.  In 2001 he was awarded a full professorship at the University of Maryland, College Park.  He held that post until 2004, when he received an appointment as a full professor at the Economics Department of the University of Chicago.  In January 2011, List was awarded an endowed professorship at the University of Chicago's Economics Department for his work in the area of field experiments.

In addition to his university career, List served as the first chief economist for taxi company Uber, and later for the similar company Lyft. List became the first chief economist for the Walmart corporation in April 2022.

Awards 
In 2015, List was shortlisted for a Nobel Prize by Reuters (alongside Charles Manski and Richard Blundell). List and Blundell were subsequently odds on favorites to win in betting parlors. List for his work on field experiments and Blundell for labor economics. At age 46, List was the youngest Reuters prediction by nearly 20 years.  In April 2011 List was selected to the American Academy of Arts and Sciences. In 2012, List was selected to receive the Yrjo Jahnsson Lecture Series prize, given by the Yrjö Jahnsson Foundation. The award, given every 2 years by the Finnish Foundation, recognized List's achievements to society from pioneering the use of field experiments. Ten of the previous nineteen recipients have gone on to win the Nobel Prize in economics.  In August 2017, List was awarded the Klein Prize International Economic Review for his work on field experiments. Six of the twenty recipients have won the Nobel Prize.  And, in 2022 List was given the Adam Smith Award, the National Association of Business Economists (NABE) most prestigious award.  NABE cited List's pioneering contributions of showing the power of field experiments to answer key business questions and resolve scaling problems within firms.      

In November 2014 he was awarded an honorary doctorate by Tilburg University. Tilburg University calls him "a true pioneer in experimental field research," whose innovative work has "finally made it possible to test behavioral economic theory in everyday practice...He has raised this research area to a higher level with his originality, expertise, and impact, and he is an inspiration to many."  In 2016, University of Ottawa bestowed the honorary doctorate to List for his pioneering work in field experiments.  In 2011 List was elected to the American Academy of Arts and Sciences. In 2015 he was elected Fellow of the Econometric Society. In 2015 and 2016, he was named to the Nonprofit Times Power & Influence Top 50. In 2017, he received the Hartsook Growing Philanthropy Award.

In 2004, List received the 1st Place Competitive Paper Award for his field experiment titled “Informational Cascades: Evidence from a Field Experiment with Market Professionals.” The paper was picked as the top research study in 2004 within finance by the FMA, which considered hundreds of studies. List received the 2008 Arrow Senior Prize for his field experimental work in the area of testing economic theory from the BE Press. In July 2010, List was awarded the highest honor by the AAEA, the John Kenneth Galbraith prize. The award was given for recognition of List's "breakthrough discoveries in economics and outstanding contributions to humanity through leadership, research, and service. In particular, List's pathbreaking work using field experiments in economics."

Work 
His work focuses on microeconomic issues, and includes over 250 academic publications.  Among these articles are field experiments using several different markets to obtain data, including charitable fundraising activities, the Chicago Board of Trade, Costa Rican CEOs, the new automobile market, sports memorabilia markets, coin markets, auto repair markets, open air markets located everywhere—from the United States to Morocco to India, various venues on the internet, several auction settings, shopping malls, various labor markets, and grammar and high schools.  In the past two decades, List has expanded his research agenda to explore theoretical and empirical aspects of scaling ideas and policies.

Behavioral economics 
List's research on behavioral economics has focused on testing theories like gift exchange, social preferences, and prospect theory. Traditional tests of these theories relied on recruiting undergraduate students to participate in experiments for a small amount of money. List instead recruited subjects in actual marketplaces to participate in experiments, sometimes unbeknownst to even the subjects. List's field experiments have found that gift exchange is not as powerful a motivator of labor effort as earlier research found, that social preferences are not as pronounced as prior research found, and that the divergence between Willingness to Pay and Willingness to Accept often called the endowment effect, predicted by prospect theory, disappears with market experience.

List's recent work in behavioral economics has found that framing can induce increased worker productivity, and has been picked up by several corporations around the world.

Environmental economics 
List has published research on the impact of environmental regulation on economic production and on endangered species. List's research has also focused on testing non-market valuation mechanisms in the field frequently used in contingent valuation and in testing different incentives to promote environmentally friendly technology adoption.  He also teaches in Kiel University Research Institute in summer 2017 where he developed ideas on non-market valuation using field experiments.

Charitable giving 
List has also brought social preferences and value of public goods to the marketplace by testing determinants of charitable giving. List has found that a number of the traditional techniques in the philanthropy world are not well understood. For example, the higher the announced seed money the more people give. Also, matching grants increase giving, but it doesn't matter if the match is 1:1 or 3:1. List has also found that giving is easily influenced by incentives that discount the importance of altruism in motivating giving. For example, List has found that beauty and social pressure are important motivators for giving. In an experiment through a solicitation mailed to 300,000 households in Alaska, List found that people are more likely to give because they want to feel good, rather than from pure altruism.

Some of his field experimental work on charitable fundraising were highlighted in The New York Times Magazine. In a 2009 Crain's Chicago Business article, List is referred to as a "rock star" in the area of philanthropy. In his role as Visiting Robert F. Hartsook Chair in Fundraising at Indiana's Lilly School of Philanthropy, he works to apply academic research for the benefit of fundraising practitioners. He also serves as principal investigator for the Science of Philanthropy Initiative.

Education 
List's recent research focuses on increasing educational achievement. In 2008 he worked with Chicago Heights, IL to design cash incentives for ninth graders and their parents to increase academic performance. In 2009 he won a $10 million grant from the Griffin Foundation to study the returns to pre-school education by founding a pre-school called The Griffin Early Childhood Center and to test the impact of performance pay for teachers in Chicago Heights, IL.

List's recent education research was recently discussed in Bloomberg.

List co-founded and co-directs the Thirty Million Words Center for Early Learning and Public Health along with Dana L. Suskind.

Other research 
List has studied the economics of discrimination, finding that discrimination in marketplaces is statistical discrimination, rarely motivated by animus. He has also investigated gender differences in competition and wages, finding that men are more likely to apply for jobs that offer incentive pay than women.  He has also researched the role of gender in competition in matrilineal and patriarchal societies, finding that women in matrilineal societies opt to compete at similar levels to men in patriarchal societies. List has also used experiments to test ideas in finance. He has tested the options model, information cascades, and the equity premium puzzle with undergraduate students and professional traders.  Many of these ideas were advanced by List when he taught at the Finnish School of Finance in 2007 on field experiments in Finance.

Personal life 
List married surgeon Dana L. Suskind in 2018 and resides with his eight children in Hyde Park, Chicago.

Press 
A collection of a few of the recent pieces written on List's field experiments can be found in the following articles.
 
 The New York Times or The Chicago Chronicle
 The University of Chicago
 www.philanthropy.com
 Periscope
 The Reporter Archives
 Letter to Our Readers
 How an inconvenient economist upset the cool crowd

Academic publications 
 List, John A., “Informed Consent in Social Science,” Science, October 21, 2008, 322(5886), p. 672.
 List, John A., “Homo experimentalis evolves,” Science, July 11, 2008, 321(5886), pp. 207–208.
 Levitt, Steven D. and John A. List, “Homo economicus evolves,” Science, February 15, 2008, 319(5865), pp. 909–910.
 Karlan, Dean and John A. List. “Does Price Matter in Charitable Giving?  Evidence from a Large-Scale Natural Field Experiment,” American Economic Review, (2007), 97(5), pp. 1774–1793.
 Harrison, Glenn W., John A. List, and Charles Towe, “Naturally Occurring Preferences and Exogenous Laboratory Experiments: A Case Study of Risk Aversion,” Econometrica, (2007), 75 (2): 433–458.
 Alevy, Jon, Michael Haigh, and John A. List. “Information Cascades: Evidence from a Field Experiment with Financial Market Professionals,” Journal of Finance, (2007), 62 (1): 151–180.
 List, John A. “On the Interpretation of Giving in Dictator Games,” Journal of Political Economy, (2007), 115(3): 482–494.
 List, John A. and Daniel Sturm. “How Elections Matter: Theory and Evidence from Environmental Policy,” Quarterly Journal of Economics, (2006), November 121(4): 1249–1281.
 Gneezy, Uri, and John A. List. “Putting Behavioral Economics to Work: Testing for Gift Exchange in Labor Markets Using Field Experiments,” Econometrica, (2006), September, 74(5): 1365–1384.
 List, John A., “The Behavioralist Meets the Market: Measuring Social Preferences and Reputation Effects in Actual Transactions,” Journal of Political Economy, (2006), 114(1): 1-37.
 Landry, Craig, Andreas Lange, John A. List, Michael K. Price, and Nicholas Rupp. "Toward an Understanding of the Economics of Charity: Evidence from a Field Experiment,” Quarterly Journal of Economics, (2006), 121 (2): 747-782.
 Haigh, Michael and List, John A. “Do Professional Traders Exhibit Myopic Loss Aversion?  An Experimental Analysis,” Journal of Finance, (2005), 60 (1): 523–534.
 List, John A. and Michael Haigh. “A Simple Test of Expected Utility Theory Using Professional Traders,” Proceedings of the National Academy of Sciences (2005), 102(3): 945–948.
 List, John A. "Testing Neoclassical Competitive Theory in Multi-Lateral Decentralized Markets," Journal of Political Economy (2004), 112(5): 1131–1156.
 List, John A. Robert Berrens, Alok Bohara, and Joe Kerkvliet. "Examining the Role of Social Isolation on Stated Preferences," American Economic Review (2004), 94 (3): 741–752.
 Harrison, Glenn and John A. List.  "Field Experiments," Journal of Economic Literature (2004), XLII (December): 1013–1059.
 List, John A. "Neoclassical Theory Versus Prospect Theory: Evidence from the Marketplace," Econometrica (2004), 72(2): 615–625.
 List, John A.  “The Nature and Extent of Discrimination in the Marketplace: Evidence from the Field,” Quarterly Journal of Economics (2004), 119(1): 49–89.
 List, John A. “Does Market Experience Eliminate Market Anomalies?,” Quarterly Journal of Economics (2003), 118(1), 41–71.
 Pacala, Steven, Erwin Bulte, John A. List, and Simon Levin, "False Alarm over Environmental False Alarms," Science (2003), 301(5637), 1187–1189.
 List, John A. "Preference Reversals of a Different Kind: The More is Less Phenomenon," American Economic Review (2002), 92(5): 1636–1643.
 List, John A. and Lucking-Reiley, David. “The Effects of Seed Money and Refunds on Charitable Giving:  Experimental Evidence from a University Capital Campaign,” Journal of Political Economy (2002), 110(1): 215-233
 List, John A. "Testing Neoclassical Competitive Market Theory in the Field," Proceedings of the National Academy of Sciences (2002), 99 (24): 15827–15830.
 List, John A. “Do Explicit Warnings Eliminate the Hypothetical Bias in Elicitation Procedures? Evidence from Field Auctions for Sportscards,” American Economic Review (2001), 91(5): 1498–1507.
 List, John A. and Lucking-Reiley, David. “Demand Reduction in a Multi-Unit Auction:  Evidence from a Sportscard Field Experiment,” American Economic Review (2000), September, 90(4): 961–972.
 List John A. and Jason F. Shogren, “Calibration of the difference between actual and hypothetical valuations in a field experiment.” Journal of Economic Behavior and Organization, (1998), 37 (2): 193–205.

References

External links 
 John List's Home Page
 Faculty Profile: John List at the University of Maryland, College Park
 Twelve Scholars Join Faculty at the University of Chicago
  at the University of Maryland, College Park
 New York Times article about John List's research into charitable giving.
 Bloomberg article about John List's research in education.

1968 births
20th-century American economists
21st-century American economists
Education economists
Economists from Arizona
Economists from Wisconsin
Environmental economists
Fellows of the American Academy of Arts and Sciences
Fellows of the Econometric Society
Living people
Scientists from Madison, Wisconsin
Academic staff of Tilburg University
University of Arizona faculty
University of Central Florida faculty
University of Chicago faculty
University of Maryland, College Park faculty
University of Wisconsin–Stevens Point alumni
University of Wyoming alumni